The 1873 Dover by-election was fought on 22 September 1873.  The byelection was fought due to the Resignation of the incumbent MP of the Liberal Party, Sir George Jessel, to become Master of the Rolls.  It was won by the Conservative candidate Edward William Barnett.

References

1873 in England
History of Dover, Kent
1873 elections in the United Kingdom
By-elections to the Parliament of the United Kingdom in Kent constituencies
19th century in Kent
September 1873 events